Armida is the fictional character of a Saracen sorceress, created by the Italian late Renaissance poet Torquato Tasso.

Description

In Tasso's epic Jerusalem Delivered, Rinaldo is a fierce and determined warrior who is also honorable and handsome. Armida has been sent to stop the Christians from completing their mission and is about to murder the sleeping soldier, but instead she falls in love. She creates an enchanted garden where she holds him a lovesick prisoner. Eventually Charles and Ubaldo, two of his fellow Crusaders, find him and hold a shield to his face, so he can see his image and remember who he is. Rinaldo barely can resist Armida's pleadings, but his comrades insist that he return to his Christian duties. At the close of the poem, when the pagans have lost the final battle, Rinaldo, remembering his promise to be her champion, prevents her from giving way to her suicidal impulses and offers to restore her to her lost throne. She gives in at this and like the other Saracen woman, Clorinda, earlier in the piece, becomes a Christian and his "handmaid".

Many painters and composers were inspired by Tasso's tale. The works that resulted often added or subtracted an element; Tasso himself continued to edit the story for years. In some versions, Armida is converted to Christianity, in others, she rages and destroys her own enchanted garden. 

She occupies a place in the literature of abandoned women such as the tragic Dido, who committed suicide, and the evil Circe, whom Odysseus abandoned to return home, but she is considered by many to be more human and thus more compelling and sympathetic than either of them.

In opera 
The story of Armida and Rinaldo has been the basis for a number of operas:
 Armida abbandonata (1627) by Claudio Monteverdi (lost)
 Armide  (1686) by Jean-Baptiste Lully
 Rinaldo and Armida (1698) by John Dennis
 Rinaldo (1711) by George Frideric Handel
 Armida al campo d'Egitto (1718) by Antonio Vivaldi
 Armida (1761) by Tommaso Traetta
 Armida abbandonata (1770) by Niccolò Jommelli
 Armida (1771) by Antonio Salieri
 Armida (1772) by Antonio Sacchini
 Armide (1777) by Christoph Willibald von Gluck
 Armida (1780) by Josef Mysliveček
 Renaud (1783), also by Sacchini
 Armida (1784) by Joseph Haydn
 Armida e Rinaldo (1786) by Giuseppe Sarti
 Armida (1802) by Francesco Bianchi
 Armida (1817) by Gioachino Rossini
 Armida (1904) by Antonín Dvořák
 Armida (2005) by Judith Weir

On 1 May 2010, Rossini's Armida was performed and broadcast live to theaters around the world in the series MetLive in HD.

Johannes Brahms composed a cantata entitled Rinaldo based on the story.

Armida as a ballet

Armida. Choreography by Jules Perrot. Music by Cesare Pugni.
Le Pavillon d'Armide. Choreography by Mikhail Fokine. Music by Nikolai Tcherepnin. Second premiere given by the Ballets Russes at the Théâtre du Châtelet, Paris on 19 May 1909.
Rinaldo and Armida. Choreography by Frederick Ashton. Music by Malcolm Arnold. First performed by the Sadler's Wells Ballet at the Royal Opera House, Covent Garden, London on 6 January 1955.

Gallery

References

Female characters in literature
Fictional witches
Literary characters introduced in the 1580s
Torquato Tasso characters